Events of the year 2023 in England.

Events

January 
 1 January – A visit by Thor the Walrus to Scarborough harbour, North Yorkshire overnight on New Years Eve results in the town's New Year fireworks celebrations being cancelled to let the walrus rest for his journey to the Arctic. He was previously spotted at Pagham Harbour, Calshot, Hampshire in December 2022.
 2 January  – Thor the Walrus makes an appearance in Blyth, Northumberland.
 7 January – Prime Minister Rishi Sunak holds talks with health leaders in England to discuss pressures facing the National Health Service.
 8 January – The government confirms plans to ban single-use items such as plastic cutlery, plates, and trays in England, with the ban subsequently announced to take effect from October.
 13 January
 Dennis McGrory, aged 75, is sentenced to life imprisonment for the 1975 murder of 15-year-old Jacqueline Montgomery following a trial at Huntingdon Crown Court. His conviction is the oldest murder case in England and Wales to involve the rule of double jeopardy.
 Following a trial at Hove Crown Court, Mark Brown, 41, of St Leonards-on-Sea, East Sussex, is given two life sentences for the 2021 murders of Alexandra Morgan and Leah Ware.
 14 January – Four women and two children are injured in a drive-by mass shooting close to a Catholic church in Euston Road, Euston, Central London. A 22-year-old man is arrested two days later on suspicion of attempted murder.
 15 January – Train passengers using the South West Main Line are warned to expect major disruptions after a section of the track north of Hook railway station in Hampshire collapsed due to a landslide.
 16 January – At London's Southwark Crown Court, former Metropolitan Police Parliamentary and Diplomatic Protection officer David Carrick admits over 40 offences including over 20 rapes.
 23 January – Salisbury Crown Court in Wiltshire convicts Lawangeen Abdulrahimzai, an Afghan who committed a double murder in Serbia before moving to the UK as an asylum seeker, by pretending to be a 14-year-old refugee, of a murder he committed in Bournemouth, Dorset, in 2022.
 25 January – Lawangeen Abdulrahimzai is sentenced to life imprisonment with a minimum of 29 years for the March 2022 murder of Thomas Roberts.

February 
 4 February – Police investigating the disappearance of Nicola Bulley, who went missing on 27 January while walking her dog, believe she may have fallen into the River Wyre at St Michael's on Wyre, Lancashire. 
 7 February – David Carrick, one of the UK's most prolific sex offenders, is sentenced at Southwark Crown Court to 36 life sentences with a minimum term of 30 years imprisonment.
 10 February – 
A large World War II bomb discovered in Great Yarmouth explodes as work is being carried out to defuse it, causing a blast that is heard for 15 miles.
During a demonstration in Knowsley, Merseyside, protesters clash with police outside a hotel that provides refuge for asylum seekers.
 17 February – 
The £2 cap on bus fares in England is extended for three months until 30 June amid concerns some routes could be lost if it were to end.
Buckinghamshire Council approves proposals for an £800m expansion of Pinewood Studios near Iver Heath.
 19 February – Police searching for Nicola Bulley, missing since 27 January, say they have found a body in the River Wyre.
 20 February – 
Mayor of London Sadiq Khan announces the launch of a £130m scheme to give every primary school pupil in London free school meals during the 2023–24 academic year.
Junior doctors in England vote to strike in their ongoing dispute for a 26% pay rise, and will stage a 72-hour walkout. The British Medical Association maintaines junior doctors' pay has been cut by 26% since 2008 after inflation is considered.
Lancashire Police confirm the body found in the River Wyre the previous day is that of Nicola Bulley.
 21 February – A planned 48-hour strike by nurses is called off to allow the Royal College of Nursing and Department of Health and Social Care to enter into renewed negotiations. The BMA maintains that junior doctor's pay has been cut by 26% since 2008 after inflation is considered.
The UK Government recommends a 3.5% pay rise for public sector workers in England, below the rate of inflation.
 22 February – Following a trial at Winchester Crown Court, Shaye Grove, 27, a woman obsessed with serial killers, is sentenced to life imprisonment with a minimum of 23 years for the murder of her boyfriend, who she stabbed to death in July 2022.
 23 February – Figures produced by the Office for National Statistics show school absences in England remain above their pre-COVID levels, with 25.1% of pupils regularly absent during the autumn term of 2022 compared to 13.1% in autumn 2019.
 24 February – The British Medical Association announces that junior doctors in England will begin a three-day strike on 13 March.

March
 3 March – 
The GMB and Unison unions have called off ambulance strikes in England scheduled for 6 and 8 March after the UK government agrees to reopen talks on pay for the 2022–23 and 2023–24 financial years.
Following a trial at Luton Crown Court, four people are jailed for their part in a robbery that went wrong during which their victim, Saul Murray, was stabbed after being given the drug GHB in an attempt to knock him out. Ikem Affia is sentenced to life imprisonment for murder, with a minimum of 25 years, while the three other gang members are given lesser sentences for manslaughter. The gang were caught after one of them was captured on CCTV wearing a rare Moncler coat worth £1,000, of which only 69 had been sold in the UK.
 5 March – The Unite union calls off ambulance strikes scheduled for 6 and 8 March.
 8 March – The National Institute for Health and Care Excellence (NICE) approves the use of the weight loss drug semaglutide (marketed as Wegovy) by the NHS in England.
 13 March – The Unite union calls off a planned strike by bus drivers at National Express West Midlands scheduled for 16 March after receiving a revised pay offer, which is to be put to members.
 16 March – 
NHS staff in England, including nurses and ambulance staff, are offered a 5% pay rise from April along with a one-off payment of £1,655 to cover backdated pay. The offer does not include doctors, who are on a different contract.  
Bus drivers at National Express West Midlands call a fresh strike for Monday 20 March after Unite claims National Express would not allow them to vote on the latest pay offer.

See also 
 2023 in the United Kingdom
 2023 in Northern Ireland
 2023 in Scotland
 2023 in Wales

References 

 
England
2020s in England
Years of the 21st century in England